Douglas Sannachan (born 1962 in Glasgow) is a Scottish actor most widely known for playing Billy the window cleaner in Gregory's Girl. His famous line was "If I don't see you through the week, I'll see you through a window". He grew up in the Calton area of Glasgow and was a pupil at John Street Secondary School, Glasgow. When he was 16 years old he was the subject of a chapter of a book called The Year of the Child  by Bel Mooney.

Sannachan was a member of the Glasgow Youth Theatre and is a friend of John Gordon Sinclair and Robert Buchanan. He appeared in other films directed by Bill Forsyth such as That Sinking Feeling  in which he played Simmy, and as well as playing Willy, was also the voice of the ice cream van, in Comfort and Joy. He also played Gerry in Submarine Escape, Edward in the Cold War drama Winter Flight and Tam in Living Apart Together.

On television, Douglas was in the children's programme Waiting for Elvis which was part of Dramarama (TV series) written by Alex Norton. The episode featured Fergie (played by Sannachan), a young singer, trying to impress Elvis Presley during his short stop at Prestwick Airport in 1960 on his only confirmed visit to the UK. He played Billy a paramedic, in Life Support (BBC1), Jim in Strathblair (BBC1), Sneck in End of the Line (BBC1) and a murderer Jimmy, in Taggart - Murder in Season  on STV when Mark McManus played the title role.

He played a pantomime dame in the Simply Red video for the track Jericho from the album Picture Book. He has continued to act on stage and screen and played the owner of a sauna in Rebus - Resurrection Men. He has also appeared on stage in productions such as The Jesuit in Edinburgh, The Lyons of Lisbon Glasgow, A Family Affair Edinburgh, Rents  London and The Lemmings are Coming, London.

He has made over thirty appearances at the Pavilion Theatre, Glasgow, including Peter Pan, Cinderella, The Wizard of Never Woz  Please Stay, The Bigot  and Paras Over the Baras.

He has also recorded his voice for radio The Bell and the Tree (Radio Clyde), Choke the Gaffer (Radio Scotland) and Short Plays for Radio (Radio 4).

In February 2018 he completed an independent comedy, horror feature film  called "Starcache" Link. The film is based on the worldwide hobby of Geocaching, but rather than people finding caches hidden in the woods, they are more likely to be killed in unusual and gruesome ways. This has led  Sannachan to coin the phrase "Slasher Cacher" to describe the genre. The film has its worldwide premiere at the Glasgow Southside Film Festival on 3 June, followed by a screening at the Centre for Contemporary Arts on 11 June 2018. The film became available to view free on Amazon Prime in July 2019  Link.

His second project "Acheron" Link is a disturbing short film on the horrors of abuse and addiction. It aims to highlight that adverse experiences in childhood can result in a cycle of addiction. The film, completed in January 2019, explores the power of the demons of addiction within  a father and son relationship. It won the Glasgow Southside Filmmakers’ Award  in 2019.

Personal life
He is currently married with two children and is living in the Southside of Glasgow.

References

External links
Douglas Sannachan on:
  Internet Movie Database
  UK Screen
  MGM Movie Database
  Film Freeway
  Starcache 2018 Trailer
  Starcache on Amazon Prime 

1962 births
Living people
Scottish male television actors
Scottish male film actors
Male actors from Glasgow
Scottish male stage actors